Quacken Kill is a stream in the U.S. state of New York. It is fed by While Lily Pond in Grafton and empties into Poesten Kill in Poestenkill

Quacken Kill is a name derived from Dutch most likely meaning "heron creek".

References

Rivers of Rensselaer County, New York
Rivers of New York (state)